Tolmeita, Tolmeta or Tolmeitha  is a village in the northern Cyrenaica region of eastern Libya, some  east of Benghazi, near Ad Dirsiyah. Its name is derived from Greek Πτολεμαΐς (Ptolemais), the name of the classical city of Ptolemais, whose ruins are nearby.

See also 
 List of cities in Libya

References

Populated places in Marj District
Cyrenaica